"Volverte a Amar" (Eng.: Loving You Again) is the first single from Alejandra Guzmán's twelfth studio album Indeleble. The song was produced by Loris Ceroni and written by Mario Domm and Alejandra Guzmán. The song was very successful in Mexico and United States.

In Mexico, the ringtone of this single was certified double-gold. The single also hit #1 there and #6 on the Billboard's Hot Latin Tracks chart (the highest peak for the artist on that chart).

The song received a Latin Grammy Award nomination for Best Rock Song, awarded to Gustavo Cerati.

Chart performance

Certification

References

2006 singles
Alejandra Guzmán songs
Songs written by Mario Domm
Songs written by Alejandra Guzmán
2006 songs